Mainz-Marienborn station is a railway station in the municipality of Mainz, Rhineland-Palatinate, Germany.

Notable places nearby
ZDF-Sendezentrum

References

Marienborn
Buildings and structures in Mainz